Graham Johnston may refer to:

Graham Johnston (swimmer) (1930–2019), South African swimmer
Graeme Johnston (born 1942), former Australian rules footballer
Graeme Johnstone (1945–2012), state coroner of Victoria, Australia, 1994–2007

See also
Graham Johnson (disambiguation)